Walter Burke, nicknamed "Ping", is an American former Negro league pitcher who played in the 1930s.

A native of Greensboro, Georgia, Burke played for the Atlanta Black Crackers in 1937. In eight recorded career games on the mound, he posted a 0.95 ERA with 48 strikeouts over 47.1 innings.

References

External links
Baseball statistics and player information from Baseball-Reference Black Baseball Stats and Seamheads

Year of birth missing
Atlanta Black Crackers players
Baseball pitchers
Baseball players from Georgia (U.S. state)
People from Greensboro, Georgia